USS Natick may refer to the following ships of the United States Navy:

, was renamed USS Natick (SP-570) in 1917
, a tugboat acquired by the U.S. Navy in 1961

United States Navy ship names